The Sard MC8-R was a modified and lengthened version of the Toyota MR2 (SW20) built for GT racing by Toyota's SARD (Sigma Advanced Research Development) works team.

SARD heavily modified the original MR2 frontal chassis deriving with custom rear chassis in order to fit a twin-turbo version of the 4.0-liter 1UZ-FE V8 producing . This is the first car which only using the frontal chassis of production car was effectively a purpose-built semi-sports-prototype that successfully got GT1 homologation. The MC8-R lacked pace and was very unreliable in that makes it often at the bottom of the race and even the 'traditional' GT1 Toyota Supra also faster than it and let alone with the McLaren F1 and Ferrari F40.

Since the custom rear chassis and numerous dedicated components will lead to significant differences from the original MR2, a homologation car had to be built. SARD built one MC8 road car in order to meet homologation requirements. This car disappeared from public eye within a year of its construction, but resurfaced again on the Japanese collector car website SEiyaa in 2015, two decades after its disappearance. The car is currently in the possession of a private collector, who has registered the car for road use in Japan.

1995 and 1996 
The MC8-R paritcipated 1995 BPR Global GT Series which is the first purpose-built semi-sports-prototype that successfully got GT1 homologation which inspired 911 GT1 that kind of homologation specialists which planted a foreshadowing for the cancellation of GT1.
The MC8-R made its first outing in the 1995 24 Hours of Le Mans piloted by Alain Ferté, Kenny Acheson, and Tomiko Yoshikawa. It retired after 14 laps. Later that year the car attempted the 1000km Suzuka, this time managing to finish 26th overall.
One MC8-R was entered in the 1996 24 Hours of Le Mans, piloted by Masanori Sekiya, Hidetoshi Mitsusada, and Masami Kageyama. The team qualified 37th and finished 24th, second-to-last of finishers.

1997 
The team also entered the 1997 24 Hours of Le Mans, but driver Olivier Grouillard failed to make it past pre-qualifying. Two cars were also entered in the FIA GT Championship round at the 1997 Suzuka 1000km (one by Team Menicon SARD and one entered by IDC Ootsukakagu SARD), but neither car managed to finish. It was replaced for the following year with the Toyota GT-One.

See also 
 Toyota MR2

References 

Motorsport
Toyota racing cars